José María Mazón Ramos (born 23 July 1951) is a Spanish engineer and politician affiliated to Regionalist Party of Cantabria. He is member of the Congress of Deputies for Cantabria since 2019 and spokesperson for Regionalist Party of Cantabria in the Mixed Group. He was re-elected in the November election.

References

1951 births
Living people
21st-century Spanish politicians
People from Oviedo
Members of the 13th Congress of Deputies (Spain)
Regionalist Party of Cantabria politicians
Members of the 14th Congress of Deputies (Spain)